Elk Township, Ohio, may refer to:
Elk Township, Noble County, Ohio
Elk Township, Vinton County, Ohio

See also
 Elkrun Township, Columbiana County, Ohio 

Ohio township disambiguation pages